Jan Peterek (born October 17, 1971) is a Czech professional ice hockey player. He played with HC Oceláři Třinec in the Czech Extraliga during the 2010–11 Czech Extraliga season.

References

External links

1971 births
Czech ice hockey forwards
HC Oceláři Třinec players
Living people
People from Havířov
Sportspeople from the Moravian-Silesian Region
HK Dukla Trenčín players
HC Havířov players
HC Vítkovice players
Ässät players
Lokomotiv Yaroslavl players
Czech expatriate ice hockey players in Finland
Czech expatriate ice hockey players in Russia